Mohammad Asef Soltanzadeh (Dari Persian: محمد آصف سلطان‌زاده) was born in Kabul, Afghanistan in 1964, moved to Pakistan, then Iran in 1985, and in 2002, to Denmark. He is a writer specialising in prose and drama. He writes primarily in Dari Persian.

"Discovered by the Iranian writer and critic Hushang Golshiri, he has published his short stories in various literary journals. When his book Dar Goriz Gom Mishawim (English: We Disappear in Flight) was published in Tehran in 2000, he became famous among experts of literature in the Persian language (one of the literary languages of Afghanistan). The volume includes 8 stories.

In Iran a second volume of his short stories is being published."

His two collections of short stories, We Disappear in Flight and The Deserter won the prestigious Golshiri Award in Iran in 2001.

Soltanzadeh's short story Dotai pashe (A Pair of Clubs) from We Disappear in Flight has been translated from Dari Persian into Polish by Ivonna Nowicka.

Works

Short stories
His most recent collections of stories, in Persian, are:
 We Disappear in Flight, Tehran: Agah, 2000.
 Newyear's Day Is Delightful Only in Kabul
 Now Denmark
 The Deserter
 You Who Are Here, This Is Not Your Land

Novels
 Eden's Hell (2 binds), Copenhagen: Bita Book, 2009.
 Book of Exodus, Copenhagen: Dyiar-e Ketab, 2011.
 The Cinematographer of Noqrah, Copenhagen: Bita Book, Dec. 2011.
 Alas, Mullah Omar, Copenhagen: Bita Book, 2013.
 The brazen Bulls, Copenhagen: Bita Book, 2014.
 The poisonous land, Copenhagen: Bita Book, 2017.

Anthologized in
 Another Sea, Another Shore: Persian Stories of Migration. Ed. and trans. Shouleh Vatanabadi and Mohammad Mehdi Khorrami. Northampton, MA: Interlink Books, 2004.
 "Sohrab's Wars: Counter Discourses of Contemporary Persian Fiction". Ed. and trans. Mohammad Mehdi Khorrami and Pari Shirazi. Costa Mesa, California, Mazda Publishers, Inc., 2008.
 "Herfra min verden går. 23 flersprogede forfattere i Danmark". Copenhagen, Dansk PEN, 2009.
 "Writing from Afghanistan". Ed. and trans. Anders Widmark. at the  website.

Awards
 Golshiri Award, 2001 (Golshiri Foundation, Iran) - "for The Best First Collection of Short Stories, chosen for its impressive and macabre themes achieved through seemingly simple and unadorned language strewn with words and expressions from the author's homeland. Soltanzadeh's book has since been translated into French [Assef Soltanzadeh, Perdus dans la fuite, Actes sud, Paris, 2002] and Italian [M. A. Soltanzade, Perduti nella fuga, AIEP Editore, San Marino, 2002]."
 Danish Refugee Council Artist Award, 2003.
 Golshiri Award, 2007 (Golshiri Foundation, Iran) - for The Deserter, Award for the Best Collection of Short Stories.
 Nawrooz Award, 2010 (Kabul, Afghanistan) - for "The Deserter", Award for the Best Collection of Afghan Short Stories of the Decade.

References

External links
for further reading:
 Nation, War and Exile as Portrayed in Afghan Diasporic Fiction: The Case of Muhammad Asef Soltanzadeh, lecture by Dr. Mir Hekmatullah Sadat at the "Afghanistan in Ink: Literatures of Nation, War, and Exile" conference, January 14, 2010. UCLA Center for Near Eastern Studies. Posted January 2010. Consulted 5 September 2010.
 Afghanistan in Ink: Literatures of Nation, War, and Exile, by Wali Ahmadi (UC Berkeley), "Afghanistan in Ink: Literatures of Nation, War, and Exile" conference at UCLA, January 14, 2010. UCLA Center for Near Eastern Studies. Consulted 5 September 2010.
 Review and excerpt from Perduti nella fuga in Sagarana, novi libri, with a brief biography of the author as well (in Italian). Sagarana, rivista letteraria trimestrale, No. 10, January 2003.
 Brief biography at the 2010 International Literature Festival of Lviv website (in Ukrainian).
 Biography of the author at the World Wide Words Festival of Denmark website (in Danish). Archived.

Afghan writers
Living people
1964 births
Afghan expatriates in Pakistan
Afghan expatriates in Iran
Afghan expatriates in Denmark